Lawren Stewart Harris  LL. D. (October 23, 1885 – January 29, 1970) was a Canadian painter, best known as a leading member of the Group of Seven. He played a key role as a catalyst in Canadian art and as a visionary in Canadian landscape art.

Early years
Lawren Stewart Harris was born on October 23, 1885 in Brantford, Ontario. He was the son of Thomas Morgan Harris and Annabelle Stewart. His father was secretary to the firm of A. Harris, Sons & Company Ltd., merchants of farm machinery, which merged with the Massey firm in 1891, forming the Massey-Harris Company, later known as Massey Ferguson. Lawren Harris's share of the fortune that resulted made him free from financial cares the rest of his life. Although born to wealth, he was an individual who made his own path in his own individual way. In 1894, his father died and the family moved to Toronto. In 1899, he began to board at St. Andrew's College, which was located in Rosedale in Toronto at the time, then in 1903 attended University College at the University of Toronto. From 1904 to 1908 he studied in Berlin under Adolf Schlabitz, Franz Skarbina, and most likely Fritz von Wille, gaining an academic foundation similar to that which was offered by the Paris academies. Harris stayed in Berlin for three years, learning about Impressionism and Post-Impressionism as well as seeing exhibitions of German and European modern art. Among these exhibitions were several of the Berlin Secession and a comprehensive review of 19th century German art. In 1908 he travelled to Austria, Italy, France and England before returning to Toronto. 
He brought back an influence not only from his teachers but from the Secessionist movement he had encountered in Berlin. Through his reading and teachers, he may also have learned about Theosophy.

Career

In Toronto, to which he returned in 1908, Harris found friends through the Arts and Letters Club of Toronto which he joined in 1909, making friends with journalist Roy Mitchell, another early member. In 1910, he became interested in philosophy and Eastern thought, likely through Mitchell, and began discussing Theosophy seriously (although it was not until 1924 that he formally joined the Toronto Lodge of the International Theosophical Society). From 1910 to 1918, he focused in his painting on the urban landscape of Toronto, featuring a significantly brightened palette, an attention to light, and a layered development of space in order to convey a sense of place. In 1911, he met and became friends with J. E. H. MacDonald who was exhibiting sketches in the clubroom of the Club. Harris and MacDonald went on sketching trips and together visited the exhibition of contemporary Scandinavian art in Buffalo at the Albright Gallery (today, the Albright-Knox Gallery) in 1913. Seeing it, they realized that they too could create a landscape art that was distinctly Canadian and modern.

In 1913, Harris took the first step that would cement a group of like minded artists together in Canadian art, by inviting A. Y. Jackson, then in Montreal, to Toronto. The following year, he and his friend Dr. James MacCallum, financed the construction of a Studio Building in Toronto which provided artists, among them Tom Thomson, with an inexpensive space to work. In 1915, Harris fixed up a shack behind the Studio Building for Thomson whose art and dedication to his career proved inspirational for Harris. In 1918 and 1919, Harris financed boxcar trips for the artists of the later Group of Seven to the Algoma region, traveling along the Algoma Central Railway and painting in areas such as the Montreal River and Agawa Canyon. His work showed the effect of such trips: he began sketching in oil en plein air as a regular practice and used the sketches as a guide in constructing his major canvases.

In May 1920, Harris, J. E. H. MacDonald, and Franklin Carmichael, A. Y. Jackson, Frank Johnston, Arthur Lismer, and Frederick Varley, formed the Group of Seven. In the fall of 1921, Harris ventured beyond Algoma to Lake Superior's North Shore, where he would return annually for the next seven years. While his urban and Algoma paintings of the late 1910s and early 1920s were characterized by rich, bright colours and decorative compositional motifs, the discovery of Lake Superior as a source of subject material meant the depiction of what Jackson called a "sublime order". Harris conveyed the spiritual side to the scene through a more austere, simplified style, with a limited palette. In 1924, a sketching trip with A.Y. Jackson to Jasper National Park in the Canadian Rockies marked the beginning of Harris' mountain subjects, which he continued to explore with annual sketching trips until 1928, exploring areas around Banff National Park, Yoho National Park and Mount Robson Provincial Park.  In 1930, Harris went on his last extended sketching trip, travelling to Greenland, the Canadian Arctic and Labrador aboard the Royal Canadian Mounted Police supply ship and ice breaker, the  SS. Beothic, for two months, during which time he completed over 50 sketches. The resulting Arctic canvases that he developed from the oil panels marked the end of his landscape period.

Modernism and Harris
Harris's artistic career was one of constant exploration. He was the only member of the Group of Seven to align himself with European and American forms of Modernism. He always had been deeply interested in developments in modern art. In 1926, he represented Canada in the International Exhibition of Modern Art organized by the Société Anonyme (of which he was a member) and shown at the Brooklyn Museum in New York: he helped bring the show to Toronto in 1927. In 1934, he painted his first abstract pictures, which depended partly on his desire to express ideas of the spirit, partly on his earlier landscapes of Lake Superior, the Rocky Mountains and the Arctic. After a period of experimentation, from 1936 on, Harris enthusiastically embraced abstract painting. In these years, he moved to Hanover, New Hampshire in 1934, then Santa Fe, New Mexico in 1938 and finally, Vancouver in 1940. In time, he left all reference to landscape behind, and his work underwent changes towards a more organic form. He wrote about the path an abstract artist took from representation to abstraction to become fully abstract in an Essay on Abstract Painting published in 1949. In the 1950s, he painted his version of abstract expressionism. In 1954, in a separate publication that developed from his earlier essay on abstraction, he praised abstraction, writing: 
...(in abstract art), we have a creative adventure in harmony with the highest aspiration and search for truth, beauty and expressive evocation and communication in our own day".

Memberships in Art Organizations
In May 1920, Harris, J. E. H. MacDonald, and Franklin Carmichael, A. Y. Jackson, Frank Johnston, Arthur Lismer, and Frederick Varley, formed the Group of Seven. After disbanding of the Group of Seven in 1933, Harris and the other surviving members, were instrumental in forming its successor the Canadian Group of Painters. Harris served as its first president. In 1938, he helped organize the Transcendental Group of Painters in the United States. In 1941, he was a founder of the Federation of Canadian Artists, founded in Toronto and President (1944-1947).

Honours
In 1926, his work won a gold medal at Sesquicentennial International Exposition of Philadelphia. In 1931, he won the Baltimore Museum of Art prize in the first Baltimore Pan-American Exhibition of Contemporary Paintings. In 1946, Harris was awarded an honorary degree from the University of British Columbia. He received an L.L.D. from the University of Toronto in 1951. In 1953, he received an L.L. D. from the University of Manitoba, Winnipeg. In 1961, he received the Canada Council medal for 1961. In 1969, he was given a Medal from the Royal Canadian Academy of Arts. In 1970, he was made a Companion of the Order of Canada, conferred posthumously.

Harris has been designated as an Historic Person in the Directory of Federal Heritage Designations.

Personal life
On January 20, 1910, Harris married Beatrice (Trixie) Phillips. The couple had three children: Lawren P. Harris, Margaret Anne Harris, and Howard K. Harris, all born in the first decade of their marriage. Harris later fell in love with Bess, the wife of his school-time friend, F.B. Housser, but divorce was seen at the time as causing an outrage, particularly for a man as socially prominent as Harris.

Harris eventually left his wife of 24 years, Trixie, and his three children, and married Bess Housser in 1934. He was threatened with charges of bigamy by Trixie’s family because of his actions. Later that year he and Bess left their home and moved to the United States. In 1940 they moved to Vancouver, British Columbia. Bess died in 1969. Lawren Stewart Harris died in Vancouver in 1970. His ashes and those of Bess are buried on the grounds of the McMichael Canadian Art Collection, Kleinburg.

Legacy
In Toronto, a park in Rosedale at 145 Rosedale valley Road was named for him. A solo exhibition of Lawren Harris was shown in the United States at the Americas Society Art Gallery in New York. In 2015, a travelling exhibition of Harris’ work, The Idea of North: The Paintings of Lawren Harris, curated by Steve Martin, opened at the Hammer Museum in Los Angeles, California. In 2016, a film about Harris's life, Where the Universe Sings, was produced by TV Ontario. It was created by filmmaker Peter Raymont and directed by Nancy Lang. In 2017, guest curators Roald Nasgaard and Gwendolyn Owens, organized an exhibition titled Higher States: Lawren S. Harris and his North American Contemporaries, comprising some seventy paintings at the McMichael Canadian Art Collection. It featured works by Canadian and American contemporaries of Harris' such as Bertram Brooker, Emily Carr, Lionel LeMoine FitzGerald, Arthur Dove, Georgia O'Keeffe, Raymond Jonson, Emil Bisttram and Marsden Hartley.

Record sale prices
In 1981, South Shore, Baffin Island was sold for $240,000, a record price for a Canadian painting. On May 29, 2001, Harris's Baffin Island painting was sold for a record of $2.2 million (record up to that time). Before the auction, experts predicted the painting done by one of the original Group of Seven would top $1 million, but no one expected it to fetch more than twice that amount. The painting, which has always been in private hands, depicts icy white mountains with a dramatic blue sky. In 2005, Harris's painting, Algoma Hill, was sold at a Sotheby's auction for $1.38 million. It had been stored in a backroom closet of a Toronto hospital for years and was almost forgotten about until cleaning staff found it.

On May 23, 2007, Pine Tree and Red House, Winter, City Painting II by Harris came up for auction by Heffel Gallery in Vancouver, BC. The painting was a stunning canvas from 1924 that was estimated to sell between $800,000 and $1,200,000. The painting sold for a record-breaking $2,875,000 (premium included). On November 24, 2008, Harris's Nerke, Greenland painting sold at a Toronto auction for $2 million (four times the pre-sale estimate).

On November 26, 2009, Harris's oil sketch, The Old Stump, sold for $3.51 million at an auction in Toronto. In May 2010, Harris's painting, Bylot Island I, sold for $2.8 million at a Heffel Gallery auction in Vancouver, British Columbia. On November 26, 2015, his painting Mountain and Glacier was auctioned for $3.9 million at a Heffel Fine Art Auction House auction in Toronto, breaking the previous record for the sale of one of Harris's works. Another piece, Winter Landscape, sold for a hammer price of $3.1 million in the same auction.  On November 23, 2016, Mountain Forms, estimated at $3–5 million, sold for $11.2 million at the Heffel Auction, the present high.

See also

The Studio Building
The Indian Church (1929 painting, renamed Church at Yuquot Village in 2018 by the Art Gallery of Ontario) 
Alexandra Biriukova, the architect who designed Harris's residence located at 2 Ava Crescent in Forest Hill, begun in 1931

References

Bibliography

Primary sources

 
 
 
 
 
 
 
 
 
 
 
 , reproduced in

Secondary sources

Exhibition catalogues

  (Chronology by Peter Larisey)

The Group of Seven and Canadian art

External links

McMichael Canadian Art Collection - Group of Seven - Lawren Harris
Detailed Biography of Lawren Harris and Artworks, retrieved on May 25, 2007.
Lawren Harris Collection at the National Gallery of Canada, Ottawa, Ontario.

20th-century Canadian painters
Canadian male painters
Canadian landscape painters
Canadian Impressionist painters
Companions of the Order of Canada
Group of Seven (artists)
Artists from Ontario
People from Brantford
1885 births
1970 deaths
St. Andrew's College (Aurora) alumni
Persons of National Historic Significance (Canada)
20th-century Canadian male artists
University of Toronto alumni